The 2019 French Road Cycling Cup is the 28th edition of the French Road Cycling Cup. Compared to the previous season, the same 15 events were held.

The defending champion from the previous season is Hugo Hofstetter.

Events

Race results

Grand Prix d'Ouverture La Marseillaise

Grand Prix de Denain

Classic Loire Atlantique

Route Adélie

La Roue Tourangelle

Paris–Camembert

Tour du Finistère

Tro-Bro Léon

Grand Prix de Plumelec-Morbihan

Boucles de l'Aulne

Poly Normande

Grand Prix de Fourmies

Tour du Doubs

Grand Prix d'Isbergues

Tour de Vendée

Final Cup standings

Individual
All competing riders are eligible for this classification.

Young rider classification
All riders younger than 25 are eligible for this classification.

Teams
Only French teams are eligible to be classified in the teams classification.

Notes

References

External links
  

French Road Cycling Cup
French Road Cycling Cup
Road Cycling